Loboc, officially the Municipality of Loboc,  is a 4th class municipality in the province of Bohol, Philippines. According to the 2020 census, it has a population of 17,418 people.

The Loboc Children's Choir, who perform in different floating stations located at the river's end, has won numerous competitions both domestic and international. Tourists also visit to see the tarsier, a small, nocturnal, monkey-like mammal with large, red eyes. It is one of the world's smallest primates.

Until the 2013 earthquake, portions of the Loboc Church complex (specifically parts of what became the convent or priests' residence) were amongst the oldest standing religious structures in the island of Bohol. The earthquake also damaged the lunch cruise's Docking Port, and caused damage to the pedestrian river bridge and its passenger elevator.

In late 2014, Tropical storm Seniang passed directly over the Loboc river area. Although the winds were relatively weak, Seniang brought substantial rainfall. This caused the river to burst its banks in several places: the entire poblacion main plaza was flooded, including the town hall; many of the lunch cruise boats were damaged; and the accumulated debris of the church was disturbed and some washed away. It was fortunate that the new replacement bridge across the river had been completed just a few weeks before, allowing traffic to reach Tagbilaran via Sikatuna since the Loay interior road was damaged and impassable.

The Loboc Church is currently in the tentative list for UNESCO World Heritage Sites under the Baroque Churches of the Philippines (Extension). A proposal has been suggested by scholars to make a separate UNESCO inclusion for the Old Centre of Loboc which includes the Loboc Church. The same would be made for other churches listed in UNESCO's tentative sites, where each town plaza and surrounding heritage buildings would be added. At present, government agencies are still yet to take action on the proposal.

History

Since pre-Hispanic times, Loboc has always been an inland market village where produce from the sea was bartered for the agricultural goods of the upland regions. It is said to be the domain of Sigala, another chief of Bohol, whose contemporary, Sikatuna, made the famous Blood Compact with Miguel López de Legazpi in 1565.

In 1596, the Jesuit priest Fr. Juan de Torres, SJ came to Loboc from Baclayon to found the second Christian settlement on the island. After the traumatic Moro raid on Baclayon on 26 October 1600, the Jesuit missionaries decided to move the center of their missionary activities to the inland village of Loboc. By 1602, Loboc became a parish, making it the oldest on the island. To the Jesuits, Loboc was the "Residencia Boholana", where their local superior resided. It remained so until the middle of the 18th century when the exigencies of the times forced to them to move once more to Baclayon.

Around 1604, the Jesuits established a "Seminario-Colegio" or boarding school for native boys. This school laid the foundation of the musical culture of the town. Today the name Loboc is synonymous with musical acumen.

In June 1942, troops of the Imperial Japanese Army occupied Loboc. In 1945, Loboc was gradually liberated by the Philippine Commonwealth Army troops of the 8th and 83rd Infantry Division, together with Boholano guerrillas, forming part of the conclusion of World War II.

Places of interest

Loboc Church 
The Loboc Church is one of the most beautiful in the entire province. The first stone church was built in 1602. It was destroyed by fire in 1638 and its replacement built beside the site of the older one. This is the church presently standing, a fine example of the Jesuit colonial architecture of the 18th century.

After the expulsion of the Jesuits in 1768, the Augustinian Recollects took over and renovated the unfinished structure. They were responsible for the free-standing bell tower, the arcade façade, the mortuary chapel, the heavy stone buttresses and the unique three-storey convent built into the fabric of the Jesuit-built 17th century church.

Two saintly figures lived and were buried at the Loboc church: Fr. Alonso Humanes, SJ whose grave became the object of pilgrimages after his death in 1633, and the native boy, Miguel Ayatumo, a student of the Seminario Colegio, who died in the honor of sanctity at the age of 16 in 1609. Contemporary Jesuit records speak proudly of a second "Aloysius Gonzaga" who is from Bohol.

The Loboc Church contains a lot of interesting treasures. Among these are the decorative stone carvings and friezes on the exterior walls; a relief of St. Ignatius Loyola in polychrome stucco hidden behind the main altar, seven ancient retablos from both the Jesuit and Recollect periods; ceiling murals executed in the 1920s by Cebuano artists Ray Francia and Canuto Avila, one depicting the miracle of Our Lady of Guadalupe, the town's secondary patron, during the great flood of 1876; carved wooden cornices and decorative corbels shaped as gargoyles or mythical animals.

Much of the early history of Bohol was made around the town and church of Loboc. It would not be an understatement to say that to know Loboc is to understand the entire drama of Bohol history. At present, Loboc church is deteriorating, ignored by tourists and visitors and continually threatened by the annual flood that has already robbed it of its ancient records and other priceless relics. The church was severely damaged by the 2013 Bohol earthquake, and the tropical storm Seniang at the end of 2014 washed away most of the remains waiting for repair.

Geography

Barangays
Loboc comprises 28 barangays:

Climate

Demographics

Economy

Gallery

Notes

References

External links

 [ Philippine Standard Geographic Code]
Municipality of Loboc
Loboc

Municipalities of Bohol
1596 establishments in the Spanish Empire